The Johnson-Portis House is a historic house at 400 Avalon Street in West Memphis, Arkansas.  Built 1936–38, it is a prominent local example of Tudor Revival architecture, designed by architects George Mahan Jr. and Everett Woods. It has a steeply pitched roof with half-timbered gables, and small-paned windows, all hallmarks of the style, and is set on an estate property landscaped by Highberger and Park.  The property was developed for J.C. Johnson, a local judge.

The house was listed on the National Register of Historic Places in 2017.

See also
National Register of Historic Places listings in Crittenden County, Arkansas
http://www.woodridgecare.com/center-oak-ridge.html

References

Houses on the National Register of Historic Places in Arkansas
Colonial Revival architecture in Arkansas
Houses completed in 1938
Houses in Crittenden County, Arkansas
National Register of Historic Places in Crittenden County, Arkansas
Buildings and structures in West Memphis, Arkansas